Anna Danilina and Viktória Kužmová were the defending champions but Danilina chose not to participate. Kužmová partnered alongside Rosalie van der Hoek, but lost in the first round to Magdalena Fręch and Kateryna Volodko.

Tímea Babos and Kristina Mladenovic won the title, defeating Fręch and Volodko in the final, 6–1, 6–3.

Seeds

Draw

Draw

References

External Links
Main Draw

Al Habtoor Tennis Challenge - Doubles